The Kaiser-Fleetwings XBTK was an American dive and torpedo bomber developed by Kaiser-Fleetwings for the United States Navy starting in 1944. After only five examples had been built, with the first two being flying prototypes; the contract was terminated in September 1946.

Development
In early 1942, the U.S. Navy's Bureau of Aeronautics (BuAer) was planning the replacements for the Curtiss SB2C Helldiver dive bomber and the Grumman TBF Avenger torpedo bomber. The aircraft was to carry the torpedo in an internal bomb bay. By late 1943 it became obvious that the proposed VBT design like the Douglas SB2D had drastically increased in size and weight. Consequently, the U.S. Navy initiated a smaller dive bomber design, intended for escort carrier operation. The BuAer recognized the engineering workload for the major wartime programs and therefore assigned the design to companies without a major wartime production contract. BuAer selected Fleetwings at Bristol, Pennsylvania (USA), which was acquired by Henry J. Kaiser in 1943.

The XBK dive bomber program was initiated in February 1944 with a contract for two prototypes. To keep the aircraft size down, it was decided that all stores would be carried externally. A radar could be carried underneath the left wing. The dive brakes were of the lower and upper picket fence type at the inboard wing trailing edge. The horizontal tail was mounted on the tailfin above the fuselage. This feature avoided empennage buffet when the dive brakes were open. The placement of the engine exhausts was unusual, being almost aft of the cockpit. It was hoped that this feature would significantly decrease drag.

A mockup inspection without engine was carried out in April 1944 while the engine was installed in May 1944, with completion of the first prototype scheduled for November 1944. To speed up later production, the U.S. Navy even constructed a new airfield at the Fleetwing plant. In early 1945, BuAer requested that the aircraft would be able to carry a torpedo. The weapon was fitted to a new centreline station and the designation was changed to XBTK. The first XBTK-1 was finally completed in March 1945, making its first flight on 12 April 1945.

Operational history
The flight testing revealed inadequate engine cooling and severe fuselage vibration. Resolution of these problems and the replacement of the R-2800-22W engine, which was already out of production, by the -34 delayed restart of flight trials until July 1945. The aircraft was delivered to the U.S. Navy Naval Air Test Center at Naval Air Station Patuxent River, Maryland, in August 1945 for evaluation. After the end of World War II, the U.S. Navy cut orders from 20 to 10 aircraft. Test results recommended replacement of the novel exhaust system with a more normal system, as the cockpit temperature was very high and cockpit entry and exit after an engine shutdown was extremely difficult. It also noted that stall performance was poor, particularly with power off. It was noted, however, that diving characteristics were superior to any dive bomber in service or under development.

The aircraft was transported back to Fleetwings where redesign began. The second production aircraft first flew in March 1946 and featured built-in leading edge slots which greatly improved the stall performance of the aircraft. However, by early 1946 procurement of new aircraft was drastically cut down and the BTK found its role already filled by the Douglas AD Skyraider and Martin AM Mauler. In May 1946 it was decided to complete five airframes already in production. Continued testing revealed problems when the aircraft was put in a spin, and the U.S. Navy finally terminated the contract on 3 September 1946, as there was no need for the aircraft anymore. The five prototypes were scrapped, with the two "flying" examples broken up by April 1946.

Variants
XBTK-1 five prototypes built (BuNos 44313-14, 90484-86)

Operators

United States Navy

Specifications (XBTK-1)

See also

References

Notes

Bibliography
 Andrews, Hal. "XBTK-1". Naval Aviation News. May–June 1994, Vol 76 No 4. pp. 28–29. .
 Francillon, René J. "From Torpedo and Scout Bombers to Attack Aircraft" (Part 3). Air International October 1995, Vol 49 No 4. pp. 236–242. .
 Kowalski, Bob. Kaiser Fleetwings XBTK-1. Simi Valley, California: Ginter Books, 1999. .
Wagner, Ray. American Combat Airplanes of the 20th Century: A Comprehensive Reference. Reno, Nevada: Jack Bacon & Co., 2004. .

BT1K
1940s United States bomber aircraft
Single-engined tractor aircraft
Low-wing aircraft
Carrier-based aircraft
Cancelled military aircraft projects of the United States
Aircraft first flown in 1945